The 1984 ABC Under-18 Championship for Women was the eighth edition of the Asian Basketball Confederation (ABC)'s Junior Championship for women. The games were held at Seoul, South Korea from April 7–19, 1984. Taiwan came to Seoul to participate the competition, but withdrew later due to the conflict about using the Chinese flag during the event.

Venue
The games were held at Jamsil Arena, located in Seoul.

Preliminary round
All times are in Korean Standard Time (UTC+09:00)

Group A

Group B

Classification round

Final round

Final standings

Awards

See also
 1984 ABC Under-18 Championship

References

 
 
 
 
 
 
 
 
 
 
 
 
 
 
 
 

FIBA Asia Under-18 Championship for Women
ABC Under-18 Championship for Women
ABC Under-18 Championship for Women
ABC Under-18 Championship for Women
International basketball competitions hosted by South Korea